Pind Dadan Khan (P.D. Khan), a city in Jhelum District, Punjab, Pakistan, is the capital of Pind Dadan Khan Tehsil, which is an administrative subdivision of the district.

Location
It is located at 32°35'16N  73°2'44E on the bank of River Jhelum, about 24 kilometres east from the M2 motorway and 85 kilometres from jhelum. Pind Dadan Khan lies 6 km south of Khewra Salt Mine (or Mayo Salt Mine), 24 km east of the Lillah-Toba interchange of M2 motorway and 8 km east north of Pither Nadi. It borders with Khushab, Chakwal, Sargodha and Mandibahudin.

History
The history of the region dates to 326 BC, when Alexandar the Great and his troops camped in the area of Jalalpur Sharif prior to their battle with Raja Pourus. During the regime of Maharaja Ranjit Singh, Pind Dadan Khan was the second most important town after Amritsar and was the largest grain market in the Western Punjab. Prior to Jhelum, Pind Dadan Khan was the District head quarter , however, gradually this magnificent town lost its past glory due to continued neglect and other natural calamities which hit the region form time to time.

During British rule, it became the headquarters of the subdivision and tehsil of the same name in the Jhelum District of the British Punjab. It was on the Sind-Sagar branch of the North-Western Railway. The municipality was created in 1867  and most of the income collected by the British authorities was by octroi.

The population according to the 1901 census was 13,770.  It was formerly the dépot to which salt was brought from the Mayo Mine, from which it was carried across the river to the railway; but the bridging of the Jhelum at Haranpur and the extension of the railway to Khewra have by-passed. In earlier days, brass vessels were made in the town and there was a considerable weaving industry. Embroidered lungis were often sold at high prices.  Boat-building was a source of skilled employment, and river boats of Pind Dadan Khan make were in request throughout the whole course of the Jhelum.  However, after the construction of Mangla Dam to strengthen the irrigation system of the country as part of the Indus Basin Project, there is now diminished water flow in the river Jhelum except during the flooded season.  Manufactured products included glazed pottery of a deep red color, ornamented with black patterns and remarkably strong and of good quality was a speciality of the town, as well as stout leather riding-whips made after English patterns.

Nandana, a village near Pind Dadan Khan, is the place where Abu Rayhan Muhammad ibn Ahmad Al-Biruni came and he established a laboratory there which is still present. Alberuni calculated the diameter of earth in that laboratory during his lifetime; now the laboratory needs some interest by the government of Pakistan as it is not looked after and the building is vanishing day by day. If necessary care will not be given soon, there will be no sign of the great work by Alberuni. However, skilled artisans have left the area.

Education

During the colonial era the town had a high school. Within the city limits of Pind Dadan Khan, there are one government degree college for boys and one government degree college for girls already established and running. There is also one College of Technology in the government sector and has stated admission for three years Diploma course. Classes are started in this college. Many other private colleges are also there. A number of private schools are there to provide quality education to the residents of the area.
Almost 80% of the people are educated.

Health care
A Tehsil Headquarter Hospital is maintained by the Ministry of Health. There are many private hospitals with almost all the required facilities.

Dominant source of income

Agriculture and salt are the usual source of income. In addition, two cement factories are a major source of income for the locals.

Languages
The language spoken in Pind Dadan Khan tehsil is Lahnda based Punjabi with blend of many dialects such as Saraiki, Wanhari, Pothohari and Lunhari.

Railway Station
There is a railway station, which facilitates inexpensive travel. The train passes over a bridge known as Victoria Bridge; the train passes through three districts in one to two minutes.

References

Pind Dadan Khan
Pind Dadan Khan Tehsil
Populated places in Pind Dadan Khan Tehsil